Borch is a surname. Notable people with the surname include:

 Elna Borch (1869–1950), Danish sculptor
 Fred Borch (born 1954), American military attorney
 Gaston Borch (1871–1926), French musician
 Martin Borch (1852–1937), Danish architect
 Ole Borch (1626–1690), Danish scientist

See also
 Ter Borch